Werneria iboundji is a species of toad in the family Bufonidae. It is endemic to Gabon and only known from its type locality, Mont Iboundji. It is threatened by logging, which would likely negatively affect the micro-climate—the species depends on high humidity.

References

iboundji
Frogs of Africa
Amphibians of Gabon
Endemic fauna of Gabon
Amphibians described in 2004
Taxa named by Wolfgang Böhme (herpetologist)
Taxa named by Olivier Sylvain Gérard Pauwels
Taxonomy articles created by Polbot